Lamas or San Martín Quechua (Lamista, Llakwash Runashimi) is a variety of Quechua spoken in the provinces of Lamas in the Peruvian region of San Martin and in some villages on the river Huallaga in the region of Ucayali.

Lamas Quechua belongs to Quechua II, subgroup II-B (Lowland Peruvian Quechua).

Bibliography
Marinerell Park, Nancy Weber, Víctor Cenepo S. (1975): Diccionario Quechua de San Martín – Castellano y vice versa. Ministerio de educación del Perú
Gerald Taylor (2006): Diccionario Quechua Chachapoyas – Lamas – Castellano

References

Languages of Peru
Quechuan languages